Paddington Substation is a heritage-listed electrical substation built in 1926 and located at 1 Young Street, Paddington in the Municipality of Woollahra local government area of New South Wales, Australia. It is also known as Substation #342 Paddington 33Kv Zone. The property is owned by Ausgrid, an agency of the Government of New South Wales. It was added to the New South Wales State Heritage Register on 2 April 1999.

History 
The Paddington Zone substation is a purpose designed and built structure dating from 1926.

Description 
The Paddington Zone substation is a fine and excellent example of an unusual tuck pointed face brick building with a curved wall following its corner position. Designed in the Interwar Free Classical style it features a dominant classical rendered cornice below the parapet, a pediment above the central entrance doorway flanked by multi paned windows. It makes a considerable contribution to the character of the Paddington Streetscape. It is located in the Paddington Urban Conservation Araea as listed by the National Trust of Australia. The Paddington Zone substation is constructed using tuck pointed face brick work and features a bold rendered cornice below the parapet. External materials include face brick, cement render, and steel roller shutter.

Condition 
As at 10 November 2000, the condition was good.

Heritage listing 
The Paddington Zone substation is a fine rare and representative example of an externally intact Interwar Functionalist building located within Paddington Urban Conservation Area as listed by the National Trust. It makes a substantial contribution to the character of the streetscape in the Paddington area. It has considerable architectural significance on a state level, as the only known example of its kind in the Sydney area.

Paddington Substation was listed on the New South Wales State Heritage Register on 2 April 1999.

See also 

Australian non-residential architectural styles

References

External links

Bibliography

Attribution 

New South Wales State Heritage Register
Paddington, New South Wales
Electric power infrastructure in New South Wales
Articles incorporating text from the New South Wales State Heritage Register
1926 establishments in Australia
Buildings and structures completed in 1926
Energy infrastructure completed in 1926
Buildings and structures in Sydney